Elfriede Saarik (full name Erika Elfriede Elena Saarik, since 1941 Tubin; 22 May 1916 – 22 October 1983) was an Estonian dancer and stage actress.

Career
Elfriede Saarik was born in the Karkaraly District of Karaganda in Kazakhstan to Estonian parents. From 1935, she studied at Tiina Kapper Dance Studio and also studied piano and attended the drama study group at the Vanemuine theatre in Tartu. From 1935 until 1944, she was a dancer at the Vanemuine. In 1944, she fled the Soviet re-occupation of Estonia and fled to Sweden with her husband, composer and conductor Eduard Tubin and sons Rein and Eino, where she worked as a shop assistant and draughtsman.

She wrote the libretto for the ballet "Kratt".

Personal life
Saarik was married to composer Eduard Tubin. Their son is journalist Eino Tubin. Following her death, she was buried next to her husband in the Skogskyrkogården cemetery in Stockholm. On 4 June 2018, the remains of Saarik and Tubin were sent in urns to be interred at Tallinn's Forest Cemetery, where a memorial ceremony took place on 18 June 2018.

References

External links

1916 births
1983 deaths
Estonian female dancers
Estonian musical theatre actresses
Estonian stage actresses
Estonian World War II refugees
Estonian emigrants to Sweden
People from Karaganda
Burials at Metsakalmistu
Estonian ballerinas